Henrik Sundström was the defending champion but did not participate this year.

Guillermo Pérez Roldán won the tournament, beating Tore Meinecke in the final, 6–2, 6–3.

Seeds

Draw

Finals

Top half

Bottom half

External links
 Main draw

ATP Athens Open
1987 Grand Prix (tennis)